The Ashworth and Jones Factory is a historic building at 1511 Main Street in Worcester, Massachusetts.  It is one of the architecturally finest mid 19th century factory buildings in the city.  Built in 1870 and repeatedly enlarged, most of its sections retain high quality brickwork and mid-19th century Victorian styling.  The factory was listed on the National Register of Historic Places in 1980.  The complex has been converted into condominium residences known as Kettle Brook Lofts.

Description and history
The former Ashworth and Jones Factory complex is located in far southwestern Worcester, near the town line with Leicester, on the south side of Main Street (Massachusetts Route 9).   The complex consists of a series of buildings that roughly form a U shape.  The oldest portion is a four-story brick building, in which windows are set in recessed corbelled wall panels, with pilaster-like piers separating the windows.  The lowest floor has windows only facing the ravine below where Kettle Brook flows. There is a clock tower on one corner that is topped by a flared mansard roof.  The attached additions to the main block are one and two stories in height, and continue the styling and materials used in the original block, despite a forty-year construction range.

The factory site used for industrial purposes beginning early in the 19th century, and was purchased by Thomas Ashworth and Edward Jones in 1861, where they manufactured shoddy fabric (using recycled materials).  The buildings in which they first operated have not survived.  The present building's main block was built in 1870.  In the 1880s the business was taken over by E. D. Thayer, who built many of the additions, and manufactured woolens until his death in 1907.  George Duffy acquired the facility in 1910, and again enlarged the premises.

See also
National Register of Historic Places listings in southwestern Worcester, Massachusetts
National Register of Historic Places listings in Worcester County, Massachusetts

References

Industrial buildings and structures on the National Register of Historic Places in Massachusetts
Industrial buildings completed in 1870
National Register of Historic Places in Worcester County, Massachusetts
1870 establishments in Massachusetts